Ghaziabad Lok Sabha constituency is one of the 80 Lok Sabha constituencies in Uttar Pradesh state in northern India. This constituency came into existence in 2008 as a part of the implementation of delimitation of parliamentary constituencies based on the recommendations of the Delimitation Commission of India constituted in 2002.

Assembly Segments
Presently, Ghaziabad Lok Sabha constituency comprises five Vidhan Sabha (legislative assembly) segments. Loni, Muradnagar, Sahibabad & Ghaziabad fall under Ghaziabad district, whereas Dholana falls under Hapur district.

Members of Parliament

Election results

2019

2014

2009

See also
 Hapur Lok Sabha constituency
 Ghaziabad district
 List of Constituencies of the Lok Sabha

References

Lok Sabha constituencies in Uttar Pradesh
Ghaziabad district, India